Dundee United Football Club is a Scottish professional football club based in the city of Dundee. The club name is usually abbreviated to Dundee United. Formed in 1909, originally as Dundee Hibernian, the club changed to the present name in 1923. United are nicknamed The Terrors or The Tangerines and the supporters are known as Arabs.

The club have played in tangerine kits since August 1969, and have played at Tannadice Park since the club's foundation in 1909. United was a founding member of the Scottish Premier League (SPL) in 1998, and was ever-present in the competition until it was abolished in 2013 to make way for the SPFL structure. United was relegated in 2016 to the Scottish Championship, the second tier of the SPFL, before being promoted back to the Scottish Premiership in 2020.

Domestically, the club has won the Scottish Premier Division on one occasion (1982–83), the Scottish Cup twice (1994 and 2010) and the Scottish League Cup twice (1979 and 1980). United appeared in European competition for the first time in the 1966–67 season, going on to appear in Europe in 14 successive seasons from 1976. They also reached the European Cup semi-finals in 1983–84 and the UEFA Cup final in 1987.

The club contest the Dundee derby with local rivals Dundee F.C.; this is the geographically closest derby in Britain, for Dens Park stadium is located virtually next door to Tannadice Park. Dundee United have won the local derby 81 times, Dundee F.C. have won it 49 times, and there have been 44 draws between the close rivals.

History

Beginning (1909–1959) 

The club was formed as Dundee Hibernian in 1909, playing from the outset at Tannadice Park (previously known as Clepington Park), named after the street it's located on - Tannadice Street. They were voted into the Scottish Football League in 1910. After being saved from going out of business in October 1923, the club changed their name to Dundee United in order to widen their appeal. Between 1925 and 1932 United were promoted and relegated between the first and second tier three times, winning the Second Division title in 1925 and 1929.

Promotion to the top flight (1959–1971) 
The club took significant strides forward when Jerry Kerr became manager in 1959. Kerr's team won promotion in his first season in charge and became an established team in the top flight, where they remained until 1995.

A key characteristic of Kerr's reign was the strengthening of the playing squad with Scandinavian imports, most notably with the signings of Lennart Wing, Finn Dossing, Mogens Berg, Finn Seemann and Orjan Persson.

It was during this period that United qualified for European competition for the first time, eliminating Inter-Cities Fairs Cup holders Barcelona on their European debut in 1966.

Jim McLean era (1971–1993) 
Jim McLean took over from Kerr in 1971 and under his management the club enjoyed the most successful era in its history. McLean's era became known for his youth policy and the offering of long-term contracts that would see future Scotland international players such as Dave Narey, Paul Sturrock, Paul Hegarty, Davie Dodds, Eamonn Bannon and Maurice Malpas spend the majority of their careers at the club.

United won their first major honour under McLean, capturing the Scottish League Cup in 1979 and again in 1980. They were crowned Premier Division champions in 1982–83.

The club were also successful in Europe, reaching the European Cup semi-finals in 1984 and the UEFA Cup Final in 1987, the latter campaign involving another elimination of Barcelona during the earlier rounds (maintaining a 100% record over the Spaniards in competitive European ties). Despite losing to IFK Gothenburg in the final, the club was awarded a FIFA Fair Play Award.

McLean retired as manager in 1993, but remained as club chairman.

Scottish Cup wins and relegation (1993–2016) 
United won the Scottish Cup for the first time in 1994 under McLean's successor Ivan Golac, but were relegated in 1995, before returning to the Premier Division a year later.

Following a number of board changes, the club was purchased from McLean in 2002 by former Morning Noon and Night co-founder and chief executive Eddie Thompson. A lifelong United fan, Thompson invested heavily in the team in a bid to compete with significant spending which had developed following the formation of the Scottish Premier League, however little progress was made until Craig Levein became manager in 2006. Levein established United as a top six club, regularly achieving European qualification before he left the club to take the post as Scotland men's national team manager in 2009.

With the foundations of the side in place, United won the Scottish Cup for a second time in 2010 under the management of Peter Houston.

After several relatively successful seasons, a series of poor results in the Premiership led to United being relegated in 2016.

Scottish Championship and promotion battles (2016–2020) 
Dundee United's first season in the Championship was under the management of Ray McKinnon. United won the Challenge Cup by beating St Mirren 2–1 in the final and they reached the play-off final for the Premiership. However they lost narrowly 1–0 to Hamilton. The second season in the second tier was less successful, as manager McKinnon was sacked and replaced with Csaba László; after a very disappointing season, United lost in the play-off semi-final to eventual promotion winners Livingston. After a poor start to the 2018–19 season the manager was once again sacked and replaced with Robbie Neilson. The team finished second in the Championship but lost in the play-offs to St Mirren, missing four penalty kicks in the process. United started the 2019–20 season in title winning form, maintaining the top spot since the opening weekend, but the season was postponed due to the global COVID-19 pandemic on 13 March 2020. On 15 April 2020, the SPFL plan proposing an end to the season was approved. A 14-point lead over second place Inverness CT saw United crowned champions and subsequently promoted back to the Premiership. On 21 June 2020, the club announced that they were parting ways with manager Robbie Neilson, who agreed a deal to return to newly relegated side Heart of Midlothian.

Scottish Premiership return (2020 – present) 
Prior to the start of the Premiership season, Dundee United hired Tranmere Rovers manager Micky Mellon to replace Neilson, and began their campaign at home to Tayside rivals St Johnstone, drawing 1–1. In their first season back in the top flight United finished in 9th place, whilst also making a Scottish Cup semi final appearance, losing to Hibernian.

In May 2021 Mellon departed the club, being replaced on 7 June by Tam Courts. Courts first season as Dundee United manager saw the team finish 4th, their highest position since 2014, and qualify to play in the third qualification round of the 2022–23 UEFA Europa Conference League.

United were eliminated in the third qualification round by AZ Alkmaar after a 7–1 aggregate defeat, losing 7–0 away from home, equaling the record defeat for a Scottish club in European competition. They started the league season equally poorly, and were beaten 9–0 at home by Celtic on 28 August 2022.

Colours and badge 

United's playing kit consists of tangerine shirts and black shorts, first used when the team played under the Dallas Tornado moniker in the United Soccer Association competition of 1967, which they were invited to participate in after their first European excursion had created many headlines in the football world. After persuasion by the wife of manager Jerry Kerr, the colour would soon be adopted as the club's own in 1969 to give the club a brighter, more modern image. The new colour was paraded for the first time in a pre-season friendly against Everton in August.

When founded as Dundee Hibernian, they had followed the example of other clubs of similar heritage by adopting the traditionally Irish colours of green shirts and white shorts. By the time the club became Dundee United in 1923, the colours had been changed to white shirts and black shorts as they sought to appeal to a wider cross-section of the community. These colours persisted in various forms up until 1969, sometimes using plain shirts, but also at various times including Celtic-style broad hoops, Queen's Park-style narrow hoops and an Airdrie-style "V" motif.

The present club badge was introduced in 2022, and saw the previous lion rampant design updated in a new logo incorporating the club colours. To mark the club's centenary in 2009, a special version of the badge with an added "1909 2009 Centenary" logo was introduced for the duration of the 2009–10 season, along with additional green trim on the badge, representing Dundee Hibernian's colours.

Previously, the lion had been represented on a simpler shield design. Although this "classic" version had been used as the club crest on the cover of the matchday programme as early as 1956, it had never appeared on the players' strip prior to 1983. Since 1959, various other designs had been worn on the shirts, incorporating either the lion rampant or the letters DUFC, often on a circular badge.

The club first introduced shirt sponsorship in the 1985–86 season when future chairman Eddie Thompson's VG chain sponsored the club in the first of a two-year deal. A six-year association with Belhaven then ensued with a sponsorless 1993–94 season. Rover began a two-year deal early in time for the 1994 Scottish Cup final, sponsoring the club until the end of the 1995–96 season. Telewest took over sponsorship from 1996 for six years until Eddie Thompson's Morning, Noon and Night started sponsoring the club in 2002. This association continued until 2006 when Anglian Home Improvements began a two-year deal with an optional third year. At the same time, Ole International became the first shorts sponsors. JD Sports' Carbrini Sportswear brand sponsored the club in the 2008–09 and 2009–10 seasons. United's shirt sponsor from the 2016–17 season was McEwan Fraser Legal, before Utilita took over the sponsorship from 2018 until 2021. United's current shirt sponsors are Eden Mill, who took over before the 2021-22 season.

United have had a number of official kit suppliers, including Adidas, Hummel, Nike and most recently Macron.

Historical home kits 

Alternative

Stadium 
Dundee United's home ground throughout their history has been Tannadice Park, located on Tannadice Street in the Coldside area of the city. This was a League Cup tie against Rangers in March 1947, when despite snow rendering Tannadice Park unplayable, the match was able to go ahead across the road at Dens Park.

The Main Stand, built in 1962, was the first cantilever to be constructed at a Scottish football ground. For long periods of its history, only a small proportion of the ground contained seated accommodation. In the late 1980s the ground had 2,252 seats out of a total capacity of 22,310.

The comparative age and proximity of their stadiums has led to various discussions about the possibility of both Dundee clubs moving to a new, purpose-built shared stadium. The most recent proposal was put forward as part of Scotland's bid to jointly host the UEFA Euro 2008 championship, with several clubs seeking to benefit from a new stadium. With planning permission given to a proposed site at Caird Park, special dispensation was requested to proceed with the proposal, as rules at the time forbade SPL teams from groundsharing. Following Scotland's failed bid to host the tournament, the scheme was shelved, although it was resurrected in June 2008, following doubts about joint-host Ukraine's ability to stage Euro 2012, and the SFA's keenness to act as an alternative host.

League Attendance
The table below displays Dundee United's league attendances over the past decade.

The highest attendance in that period came on 30 August 2019 when United beat their city rivals Dundee 6-2 in front a 14,108 crowd, their largest league attendance since 1998. In the same season United also set their highest average attendance and highest low attendance of the decade, these records being set despite the club residing in the second tier of the Scottish Professional Football League at the time. The lowest attendance of the 2019–20 season was larger than the highest attendance of the previous year, likely due to United's strong performance.

Due to United's failure to gain promotion back to the Scottish Premiership over the previous seasons and growing mistrust of the club chairman and owner, 2018–19 saw the lowest average attendance of the decade. The lowest attendance was set the season before.

The table does not include playoff attendances.

Achievements

League 
Dundee United's first trophy came in 1925, when they won the 1924–25 Division Two championship. After two seasons in the top tier, they were relegated, but they won the Division Two title for a second time in 1928–29. Immediate relegation followed and the club finished runners-up in 1931–32. Another runners-up spot was claimed in 1959–60, in manager Jerry Kerr's first season, and from then club remained in the top division for the next 35-years. Under Jim McLean's management, the club won the Premier Division title for the only time, in 1982–83, resulting in European Cup football the following season. The title win was United's last major league success, although they finished runners-up in the First Division in 1995–96, after nearly avoiding relegation the previous season, and in third place in their first season back in the Premier Division. A third lower league title was added in 2019–20, after the curtailment of the campaign with United clear in 1st place.

Cups 
The club had to wait several decades before their first realistic chance at cup silverware, when they began the first of a six-game losing streak of Scottish Cup Final appearances in 1974, losing 3–0 to Celtic. Towards the end of the 1970s, things began to change, with three successive appearances in the League Cup Final. United won their first major trophy with a 3–0 replay victory over Aberdeen in the 1979–80 Scottish League Cup Final. The club reached both cup finals in the following season; while they retained the League Cup by winning 3–0 against rivals Dundee, United lost out again in the Scottish Cup with a replay defeat to Rangers. United reached a third consecutive League Cup Final in 1981–82, but failed to make it a hat-trick of wins as they lost 2–1 to Rangers.

United suffered the agony of reaching three out of four Scottish Cup finals in the mid-1980s, only to lose them all by a single goal. First came a 2–1 defeat to Celtic in 1984–85, compounded by a 1–0 League Cup final loss to Rangers in the same season; then a 1–0 defeat in extra time to St Mirren in 1986–87; and finally, a last-minute 2–1 loss against Celtic the following year, despite being a goal ahead. A three-year gap ensued before the 1990–91 Scottish Cup final, which pitted Jim McLean against his brother Tommy, at Motherwell. The final was won 4–3 by 'Well, with United again losing in extra time. The sixth Cup Final loss was also the club's fifth final appearance in eleven years.

These defeats in cup finals at Hampden Park led to the Scottish football media claiming that United suffered from a Hampden hoodoo, as they had failed to win ten cup finals played at the ground between 1974 and 1991. When the club reached the 1994 Scottish Cup Final, manager Ivan Golac dismissed talk of the hoodoo, even though opponents Rangers were strong favourites to complete a domestic treble in the 1993–94 season. United broke the supposed hoodoo and won the Scottish Cup for the first time when Craig Brewster's goal gave them a 1–0 win.

Eleven years passed until the next Scottish Cup final appearance, when United lost 1–0 to Celtic in 2005. Sandwiched in the middle of these appearances was a defeat on penalties to Stenhousemuir in the Scottish Challenge Cup (when United failed to concede a goal in the whole competition) and a 3–0 defeat to Celtic in the 1997 Scottish League Cup Final. United then lost the 2008 Scottish League Cup Final on penalties to Rangers after the match had finished 2–2 after extra time. Dundee United won their next major trophy in 2010, under the guidance of manager Peter Houston, when First Division side Ross County were defeated 3–0 in the 2010 Scottish Cup Final. David Goodwillie scored the first goal and Craig Conway scored the second and third goals in front of 28,000 Dundee United fans at Hampden Park.

United's 10th appearance in the Scottish Cup final came in 2014, but the team lost 2–0 to St Johnstone at Celtic Park. The Tangerines reached the League Cup final the following year, but lost to Celtic in the final.

Two years later, after the club's relegation from the Scottish Premiership, they faced St Mirren in the 2017 Scottish Challenge Cup Final. United won the game 2–1, marking the club's first silverware since 2010.

Europe 

The club's first experience of Europe came in 1966–67 season when, helped by a clutch of Scandinavian players, United defeated Inter-Cities Fairs Cup holders FC Barcelona both home and away. Although Juventus proved too strong in the next round with a 3–1 aggregate victory, United made headlines and were asked to compete as Dallas Tornado in the United Soccer Association league in North America during the summer of 1967.

In 1981–82 they began a period in which they were competitive in European competition. In a six-year spell they reached one UEFA final, another semi-final and two quarter finals. After their only Premier Division win in 1983, the team reached the resulting semi-final of the European Cup in 1984, losing 3–2 on aggregate to Roma. In 1987, the club went one better, reaching the final of the UEFA Cup beating FC Barcelona in both the home and away fixtures en route to the final. Despite the 2–1 aggregate loss to IFK Gothenburg in the final, the club won the first-ever FIFA Fair Play Award for their supporters' sporting behaviour after the final defeat.

Dundee United are famous for having a 100% record against FC Barcelona in European fixtures (4 wins out of 4 matches), and remain the only British team to have achieved this feat.

The team entered the 2022–23 UEFA Europa Conference League at the third qualifying round, culminating in a 7–1 aggregate loss to AZ Alkmaar, the 7–0 second leg defeat matching the record greatest loss inflicted on a Scottish club in European competition.

Rivalries 

Dundee United's traditional rivals are Dundee, with whom they compete in the Dundee derby. The fixture was lacking a competitive element for a number of years until Dundee's return to the top flight of the Scottish game. A unique element of the rivalry lies in the fact that the clubs' stadiums are located within 100 yards of one another.

In spite of their rivalry, the two sides previously contemplated ground-sharing as part of the SFA's unsuccessful bid to host Euro 2008. Perhaps the most notable meeting was the final game of the 1982–83 Premier Division season, where if United were victors at Dens Park, they would clinch the top flight title; United were victorious thanks to an Eamonn Bannon winner.

Another intense fixture is that of the New Firm derby between United and North-East rivals Aberdeen. The match itself became one of fierce competition due to the domestic and European success the two sides achieved in the late 1970s and 1980s under the stewardship of United's Jim McLean and Aberdeen's Alex Ferguson.

St Johnstone also claim a rivalry due to the relatively close proximity of Dundee and Perth, known as the Tayside derby. The most notable meeting between the two sides was in the 2014 Scottish Cup Final, when St Johnstone won 2–0 at Celtic Park in United's tenth final appearance.

Honours

League 
 Scottish league, first tier:
 Winners: 1982–83
 Scottish league, second tier:
Winners: 1924–25, 1928–29, 2019–20

Cups 
 Scottish Cup:
 Winners: 1993–94, 2009–10
 Runners-up (8): 1973–74, 1980–81, 1984–85, 1986–87, 1987–88, 1990–91, 2004–05, 2013–14
 Scottish League Cup:
 Winners: 1979–80, 1980–81
 Runners-up (5): 1981–82, 1984–85, 1997–98, 2007–08, 2014–15
 Scottish Challenge Cup:
 Winners: 2016–17
 Runners-up: 1995–96
 Summer Cup:
 Runners-up: 1964–65

Europe 
 UEFA Cup (Europa League):
 Runners-up: 1986–87
 European Cup (Champions League):
 Semi-finalists: 1983–84

Other 
 Forfarshire Cup:
 Winners (21): 1910–11, 1914–15, 1919–20, 1928–29, 1929–30, 1947–48, 1950–51, 1953–54, 1960–61, 1962–63, 1964–65, 1968–69, 1971–72, 1974–75, 1975–76, 1976–77, 1979–80, 1984–85, 1986–87, 1987–88, 2004–05
Runners-up (12)
 Scottish War Emergency Cup:
 Runners-up: 1940
Evening Telegraph Challenge Cup:
Winners: 2005
Runners-up: 2006

Youths
SFL Youth League
Winners: 1996–97
Runners-up: 1997–98, 1999–00
 Scottish Youth Cup
Winners: 1990, 1991
Runners-up: 1989, 1998

Coaching staff

Current squad

First-team squad

On loan

Noted players

International players 
This is a list of former and current players who have played at full international level while with the club. They are ordered by nationality and year of United debut below. Additionally, two goalkeepers – Pat Onstad (Canada) and Kémoko Camara (Guinea) – were both capped while at Tannadice yet never played a first-team game for United.

  Australia
 2014 Curtis Good
 2015 Ryan McGowan
 2022 Aziz Behich

  Canada
 1998 Jason de Vos
 2004 Lars Hirschfeld

  Estonia
 2015 Henri Anier

  Finland
 1987 Mixu Paatelainen
 2021 Ilmari Niskanen

  Ghana
 2007 Prince Buaben

  Iceland
 1997 Siggi Jónsson
 2002 Arnar Gunnlaugsson

  Israel
 1999 Jan Talesnikov

  Latvia
 2010 Pāvels Mihadjuks

  Northern Ireland
 1989 Michael O'Neill
 1998 Iain Jenkins
 1998 Darren Patterson
 2000 Danny Griffin
 2008 Warren Feeney
 2013 Paul Paton
 2015 Billy Mckay
 2021 Trevor Carson

  Republic of Ireland
 2022 Jamie McGrath

 Scotland
 1973 Dave Narey
 1974 Paul Hegarty
 1974 Paul Sturrock
 1976 Davie Dodds
 1979 Eamonn Bannon
 1981 Richard Gough
 1981 Maurice Malpas
 1985 Kevin Gallacher
 1986 Dave Bowman
 1986 Jim McInally
 1986 Billy McKinlay
 1990 Duncan Ferguson
 1997 Steven Thompson
 1998 Billy Dodds
 2000 Paul Gallacher
 2000 Charlie Miller
 2003 Barry Robson
 2005 Garry Kenneth
 2005 Lee Miller
 2005 David Goodwillie
 2006 Craig Conway
 2008 Scott Robertson
 2009 Andy Webster
 2011 Gary Mackay-Steven
 2013 Andrew Robertson
 2019 Lawrence Shankland

  Senegal
 2007 Morgaro Gomis

  Slovakia
 2010 Dušan Perniš
 2018 Pavol Šafranko

  Sweden
 1964 Örjan Persson
 1965 Lennart Wing

  Trinidad and Tobago
 1993 Jerren Nixon
 2003 Collin Samuel
 2003 Jason Scotland

  Wales
 2021 Dylan Levitt

  Yugoslavia
 1988 Miodrag Krivokapić

Hall of Fame 
The club launched its official Hall of Fame in 2008, with seven inaugural members. A further six players were inducted in January 2009 and seven more in January 2010. Since then six players have been inducted each year.

2008:
  Jimmy Briggs
  Finn Døssing
  Dennis Gillespie
  Paul Hegarty
  Maurice Malpas
  David Narey
  Doug Smith

2009:
  Eamonn Bannon
  Johnny Coyle
  Hamish McAlpine
  Peter McKay
  Ralph Milne
  Andy Rolland

2010:
  Dave Bowman
  John Clark
  Davie Dodds
  Stewart Fraser
  Billy Hainey
  Ian Mitchell
  Paul Sturrock

2011:
  Kenny Cameron
  John Holt
  Duncan Hutchison
  Frank Kopel
  Erik Pedersen
  Lennart Wing

2012:
  Arthur Milne
  Jim Irvine
  Billy Kirkwood
  Billy Thomson
  Brian Welsh
  Kjell Olofsson

2013:
  Johnny Hart
  Donald Mackay
  Örjan Persson
  George Fleming
  John Reilly
  Alan Main

2014:
  Billy McKinlay
  Willie Pettigrew
  Graeme Payne
  Lee Wilkie
  Tommy Millar
  Kevin Gallacher

2015:
  Derek Stark
  Jim McInally
  Mixu Paatelainen
  Christian Dailly
  Pat Reilly
  Jim McLean

2016:
  Sandy Davie
  Jerry Kerr
  Andy McLaren
  Frank Quinn
  Richard Gough
  Seán Dillon

2017:
  Davie Wilson
  Iain Phillip
  Guido van de Kamp
  Ian Redford

2019:
  Craig Brewster
  Ivan Golac
  Jimmy Brownlie
  Tommy Neilson

Managers 

The first manager of Dundee Hibernian in 1909 was Pat Reilly. The club's longest serving and most successful manager, Jim McLean, held the position from 1971 to 1993, winning three major honours – the Scottish Premier Division title in 1982–83 and the Scottish League Cup twice in 1979 and 1980. Two Dundee United managers have won the Scottish Cup – Ivan Golac in 1994 and Peter Houston in 2010.

Women's team 

Dundee United announced in April 2015 that the club would be launching a women's team, with the aim of entering the Scottish league structure in 2016. Gavin Beith was appointed as the team's manager in June 2015.

Honours
 Scottish Women's Premier League 2
 Winners (1): 2021–22
 SWFL First Division (North)
 Winners (1): 2017–2018
 SWFL Division 2 East
 Winners (1): 2016–2017
 SWFL Division 2 Cup:
 Winners (2): 2008, 2016

References

External links 

 Official Dundee United FC website
 ArabTRUST – The Dundee United Supporters' Society
 Federation of Dundee United Supporters' Clubs
 Dundee United BBC My Club page

 
Football clubs in Dundee
Football clubs in Scotland
Association football clubs established in 1909
Irish diaspora sports clubs in Scotland
United Soccer Association imported teams
Scottish Premier League teams
1909 establishments in Scotland
Scottish Football League teams
Scottish Cup winners
Scottish Professional Football League teams
Scottish League Cup winners
Dallas Tornado
Scottish Challenge Cup winners